Kite spider refers to one of the following genera:

 Gasteracantha, the spiny orb-weavers or kite spiders
 Isoxya, the box kite spiders

Set index articles on spiders